The Network for Capacity Development in Nutrition is a working group of the United Nations Standing Committee on Nutrition. The committee established a set of working groups on capacity development in close collaboration with United Nations University. Reports are available on the Network's website.

History 
The network had an initial meeting in 2005 and five meetings between 2006 and 2010; its results are published in scientific journals. The Standing Committee on Nutrition formed nine working groups, of which the Network for Capacity Development in Nutrition was one. The network's capacity development includes human resource development, organizational, institutional and legal framework development. Capacity development is a long term, continuing process. It gives primacy to national priorities, plans, policies and processes. Participants came from Albania, Bosnia and Herzegovina, Bulgaria, Croatia, Czech Republic, Estonia, Macedonia, Hungary, Poland, Romania, Serbia, Slovakia, Slovenia and facilitators came from the Netherlands and Norway.

The network links to multiple European Community projects:

 EURRECA – European Micronutrient Recommendation Aligned
 European Food Information Resource Network Nexus - European Food Information Resource Network
 DIETS - Dietitians Improving Education Training Standards across Europe, the thematic network for dietitians in Europe

The general objective of the Network for Capacity Development in Nutrition is to initiate and support capacity development activities in research and training in Central and Eastern European countries based on country-specific needs. The objectives will be linked to CEE-specific topics of interest. This is to be open for new challenges following the changes in the various countries over time.

The European System of Cooperative Research Networks in Agriculture was established in 1974 by the UN Food and Agriculture Organization and European research institutions. It became an umbrella for cooperation between research institutions focused on food, agriculture and related fields. Since its foundation, it has expanded to include 19 networks, including Network for Capacity Development in Nutrition CEE. In 2009, with the financial support of Food and Agriculture Organization REU and technical support of the Food and Agriculture Organization, a new server was set up in Rome to serve as common technical background for the AgroWeb Network, the European System of Cooperative Research Networks in Agriculture, and the Thematic Knowledge Networks.

Publications

References

External links
 
 AgroWeb Network
 Food and Agriculture Organization of the United Nations
 

Food science institutes
Nutrition organizations
Knowledge sharing
International development organizations